Benedict Sean Taylor (born 18 April 1960) is a British actor.

Taylor was born in Hampstead, London, the eldest of six children of father, Richard, a documentary film maker, and Allegra, a writer. Taylor lived in Nigeria until 1965 and then was brought up in London.

Now based near Hampton Court in West London, Taylor is married to Kate, an editor. They have three children: Jay, Freya, and Kalila.

Taylor started working as a child actor in 1969 with the Royal Shakespeare Company. He concentrated solely on acting and voice-overs until 1985. He appeared as Nicholas Lillie in the Tales of the Unexpected (TV series) episode (9/5) "The Facts of Life" (1988). He has since expanded his creative interests to include event production, music, musical production, DJ work and documentary film making.

Selected filmography

 The Turn of the Screw (1974, TV Movie) - Timothy
 The Watcher in the Woods (1980) - Mike Fleming
 Barriers (1981-1982, TV Series) - Billy Stanyon
 Beau Geste (1982, TV Mini-Series) - Michael 'Beau' Geste
 A Flame to the Phoenix (1983) - Max Kurowicki
 The Far Pavilions (1984, TV Mini-Series) - Wally
 The Last Days of Pompeii (1984, TV Mini-Series) - Antonius
 The First Olympics: Athens 1896 (1984, TV Mini-Series) - Edwin Flack
 Black Arrow (1985, TV Movie) - Richard
 The Corsican Brothers (1985, TV Movie) - Georges Du Caillaud
 My Brother Jonathan (1985, TV Series) - Harold Dakers
 Thirteen at Dinner (1985, TV Movie) - Donald Ross
 Behind Enemy Lines (1985, TV Movie) - Simon
 Every Time We Say Goodbye (1986) - Peter
 Vanity Fair (1987, TV Series) - George Osborne
 A Perfect Spy (1987, TV Mini-Series) - Magnus Pym
 Bergerac (1989, TV Series) - Toby Lemaire
 Duel of Hearts (1991, TV Movie) - Lord Vane Brecon
 An Actor's Life for Me (1991, TV Series) - Sebastian Groom
 The Darling Buds of May (1992, TV Series) - Pieter
 Charles and Diana: Unhappily Ever After (1992, TV Movie) - Prince Andrew, Duke of York
 Jewels (1992, TV Mini-Series) - Julian
 The 10 Percenters (1993, TV Series) - Atin
 Sharpe's Regiment (1996, TV Series) - Col. William Lawford
 Monk Dawson (1998) - Bobby Winterman
 Star Wars: Episode I – The Phantom Menace (1999) - Fighter Pilot Bravo 2
 The Adventures of Young Indiana Jones: Adventures in the Secret Service (1999) - Prince Sixtus of Bourbon-Parma (archive footage)
 Notes on a Scandal (2006) - Eddie
 Trial & Retribution (2008, TV Series) - Jonathan Carlisle
 Breaking Into Tesco (2008, TV Series)
 Breathe: Act One (2009, Short) - John Franks
 Wallander (2010, TV Series) - Jurgen Nordfeldt
 Perfect Life (2010) - Bristor
 Gone (2014, Short) - Professor Thomas Verschwunden
 Unforgotten (2015, TV Series) - Mark Bennett
 The Hippopotamus (film) (2017) - Chauffeur
 The Watcher In The Woods (2017, TV Movie) - John Keller

External links

1960 births
English male film actors
English male television actors
Living people
British expatriates in Nigeria
English male child actors
Male actors from London